The Road to 'Saturn' is a 1967 Soviet action film directed by Villen Azarov.

Plot 
The film tells about Soviet intelligence agents who infiltrated the Saturn, German espionage center, engaged in subversive activities against the Russians. They gained access to classified information that would help them fulfill their mission...

Cast 
 Mikhail Volkov as Krylov / Kramer
 Georgi Zhzhyonov as Timerin
 Arkadi Tolbuzin as Drobot (as A. Tolbuzin)
 Yevgeny Kuznetsov as Simakov
 Leonid Chubarov
 Vladimir Ferapontov
 Grigoriy Gay
 Lyudmila Shaposhnikova
 Valentina Talyzina

References

External links 
 

1967 films
1960s Russian-language films
Soviet action films
1960s action films